The Journal of Ecumenical Studies is a peer-reviewed academic journal established in 1964 and published by the University of Pennsylvania Press on behalf of the Dialogue Institute and the North American Academy of Ecumenists. Its editor-in-chief is Terry Ray (Temple University). The journal was founded on dialogue between different forms of Christianity, then broadened over time to cover an extensive range of religious traditions. It is abstracted and indexed in the Arts & Humanities Citation Index and Current Contents/Arts & Humanities.

References

External links 

Journal page at Dialogue Institute

University of Pennsylvania Press academic journals
Quarterly journals
Publications established in 1964
English-language journals
Religious studies journals
Christian ecumenism